Yglesias is a surname. Notable people with the surname include:

 The Yglesias literary and journalistic family
 Helen Yglesias (née Bassine) (1915–2008), American novelist, wife of Jose
 Jose Yglesias (1919–1995), American novelist, husband of Helen
 Rafael Yglesias (born 1954), American novelist and screenwriter, son of Jose and Helen
 Matthew Yglesias (born 1981), American journalist, son of Rafael
 Rafael Yglesias Castro (1861–1924), Costa Rican politician

See also
Iglesias (surname)